Bakhatpur is a village in Dhar Kalan in Gurdaspur district of Punjab State, India. The village is administrated by a sarpanch, an elected representative of the village.

Demography 
In 2011, the village had 21 houses and a population of 101 (53 males and 48 females) according to the report published by Census India in 2011. The literacy rate was 91.11%, highest than the state average of 75.84%. The number of children under the age of 6 years was 10 (11.89% of the population) and the child sex ratio was approximately 1,200, higher than the state average of 846.

19 people were engaged in work activities, all male. According to the census, 89.47% of workers described their work as their main work and 10.53% were involved in a marginal activity providing a livelihood for less than 6 months.

Transport 

See also
List of villages in India

References 

Villages in Gurdaspur district